Events from the year 1973 in Iran.

Incumbents
 Shah: Mohammad Reza Pahlavi 
 Prime Minister: Amir-Abbas Hoveida

Deaths
Death of Mozaffar Alam.

See also
 Years in Iraq
 Years in Afghanistan

References

 
Iran
Years of the 20th century in Iran
1970s in Iran
Iran